Kamaneh (also Romanized as Kamāneh; also known as Alfatabad (Persian: الفت آباد), also Romanized as Ālfatābād) is a village in Itivand-e Shomali Rural District, Kakavand District, Delfan County, Lorestan Province, Iran. At the 2006 census, its population was 114, in 25 families.

References 

Towns and villages in Delfan County